The Metro Conference Men's Basketball Player of the Year was a basketball award given to the Metropolitan Intercollegiate Athletic (Metro) Conference's most outstanding player. The award was first given following the 1976–77 season and was discontinued after the 1994–95 season. In 1995 the Metro Conference merged with the Great Midwest Conference to form Conference USA.

There were three ties in the award's history, in 1978, 1981 and 1988. One player, Darrell Griffith of Louisville, was also named the national player of the year (1980) by being presented the John R. Wooden Award.

Louisville represents the most all-time winners with eight. The second-most belong to Southern Miss with three, all of which belong to Clarence Weatherspoon. Weatherspoon was the only three-time winner of the award, while two others earned it twice (Keith Lee and Clifford Rozier).

Key

Winners

Winners by school

See also
Metro Conference men's basketball tournament
Conference USA Men's Basketball Player of the Year

References

Awards disestablished in 1995
Awards established in 1977
Player Of The Year
NCAA Division I men's basketball conference players of the year